Nucleoporin 205 (Nup205) is a protein that in humans is encoded by the NUP205 gene.

Function 
Transport of macromolecules between the cytoplasm and nucleus occurs through nuclear pore complexes (NPCs) embedded in the nuclear envelope. NPC's are composed of subcomplexes, and NUP205 is part of one such subcomplex. It has also been recently shown that Nup205 is required  for proper viral gene expression.

References

Further reading 

 
 
 
 
 
 
 
 

Nuclear pore complex